Eric Scott Schwartz, also known as "Smooth-E", is an American comedian, musician, and actor from Thousand Oaks, California known for his energetic blend of stand-up comedy, music, and video. Eric's viral videos and parodies have earned him international media attention and he has been featured on The Tonight Show with Jay Leno, Showtime, BET, TMZ, and The Huffington Post.

Stand-up Comedy 
Billed as "one of the nation’s hottest rising stand up headliners", Eric Schwartz regularly performs as the headliner at The Improv and The Laugh Factory comedy clubs while on tour.

Music videos
The following music videos can be viewed at Eric Schwartz, with the exception of those marked with an asterisk.

Original Songs

Parodies

Notes
 Obama Style was created in collaboration with What's Trending
 We Were Never Ever Actually Together was created in collaboration with Yahoo's Sketchy series.

Discography

References

External links 
 
 
 Parodies Nuts! podcast on Sideshow Network

Year of birth missing (living people)
Living people
American stand-up comedians
Jewish American comedians
American comedy musicians
American parodists
Parody musicians
American Internet celebrities
People from Tarzana, Los Angeles
People from Thousand Oaks, California
Comedians from California
Jewish American male comedians
21st-century American Jews